Myrinia is a genus of skippers in the family Hesperiidae.

References
Natural History Museum Lepidoptera genus database

Carcharodini
Hesperiidae genera
Taxa named by William Harry Evans